Francesco Casetti (born April 2, 1947 in Trento, Italy) is an Italian naturalized US citizen film and television theorist. He is Sterling Professor of Humanities and Film and Media Studies at Yale University. He has been described as "the best analyst of cinematographic enunciation."

Biography
In 1970 he earned an MA at the Catholic University of Milan, where in 1974 he also received an “advanced degree” in Film and Communication Studies. His positions include Assistant Professor at the University of Genova (1974–1980), Associate Professor at Catholic University of Milan (1984–1994), Full Professor at the University of Trieste (1994–1998) and then at Catholic University of Milan, where he served also as the Chair of the Department in Communication and Performing Arts.

He taught as “professeur associé” at University of Paris III: Sorbonne Nouvelle (1977) and as visiting professor at the University of Iowa (1988, 1991 and 1998). In 2000 he was awarded with the Chair of Italian Culture for a distinguished scholar at the University of California – Berkeley (2000). He was William P. Evans Fellow at the University of Otago (New Zealand) in 2012, and  Fellow at the IKKM, Bauhaus University at Weimar in 2013.

He has largely written on semiotics of film and television, about genres, intertextuality, and enunciation. After an expansive study on the implied spectator in film (Inside the Gaze, Indiana, 1999, or. 1986) and in television (Tra me e te, 1988), he combined in an original way close analyses of media texts and ethnographic researches of actual audiences (L’ospite fisso, 1995), defining the notion of “communicative negotiations” (Communicative Negotiation in Cinema and Television, 2002). He has also written extensively on film theories (Theories of Cinema. 1945-1995, Texas, 1999, or. 1993). More recently he explored the role of cinema in the context of modernity (Eye of the Century. Film, Experience, Modernity, Columbia, 2008, or. 2005), and the reconfiguration of cinema in a post-medium epoch, comparing this shift with the rise of cinema at the beginning of the 20th century (The Lumière Galaxy: Seven Key words for the Cinema to Come, Columbia, 2015). His next project is a wide-ranging analysis of the anxieties that cinema raised in the first decades of the 20th century, compared with the iconophobic tradition in the western culture and with the fears triggered by the contemporary media.

With Jane Gaines (Columbia University, Film and Media Studies Graduate Chair), Casetti is the co-founder of the Permanent Seminar on Histories of Film Theories, an international network of film scholars aimed at a systematic exploration of the field of film and media theories.

Bibliography
 Casetti, Francesco (2015). The Lumière Galaxy: Seven Key words for the Cinema to Come. New York: Columbia University Press.
 Casetti, Francesco (2008). Eye of the Century. Film, Experience, Modernity. New York: Columbia University Press.
 Casetti, Francesco (2002). Communicative Negotiation in Cinema and Television. Milan: Vita e Pensiero.
 Casetti, Francesco (1999). Theories of Cinema, 1945-1990. Austin: University of Texas Press.
 Casetti, Francesco (ed.) (1995). L'ospite fisso. Televisione e mass media nelle famiglie italiane. Milan: San Paolo.
 Casetti, Francesco (ed.) (1988). Tra me e te. Strategie di coinvolgimento dello spettatore nella neotelevisione. Rome: Eri-VQPT.
 Casetti, Francesco (1986). Dentro lo Sguardo. Il Film e il suo Spettatore. Milan: Bompiani.

References

External links 
 Personal web site
 Personal page in Yale University's web site
 

Living people
Film theorists
Yale University faculty
Centro Sperimentale di Cinematografia
1947 births
Yale Sterling Professors